The 2020–21 season was the 135th in the history of Luton Town Football Club, a professional association football club based in Luton, Bedfordshire, England. Their 19th-place finish in 2019–20 meant it was the club's second consecutive season in the Championship and 95th season in the English Football League. Luton were eliminated in the third round of the 2020–21 EFL Cup, after being beaten 3–0 at home to Premier League club Manchester United, and lost 3–1 away to Chelsea, also of the Premier League, in the FA Cup fourth round.

Background and pre-season

The 2019–20 season was Luton Town's first season back in the Championship after a 12-year absence, having won the League One title in 2018–19. Manager Graeme Jones had his contract terminated by mutual consent in April 2020 with Luton in 23rd place, as part of a restructure of the club's football department to reduce its cost base, after professional football in England was suspended in March due to the COVID-19 pandemic. With nine matches remaining in the 2019–20 Championship season and the club six points from safety, Nathan Jones was reappointed manager in May, after leaving Stoke City in November 2019. The season resumed in June, and despite being in the relegation zone with one match remaining, Jones led Luton to safety from relegation with a 19th-place finish, after a 3–2 home win over Blackburn Rovers on the final day of the season.

At the end of the 2019–20 season, Luton released Jacob Butterfield and Callum McManaman, while Luke Berry, Danny Hylton, Elliot Lee, Kazenga LuaLua and Glen Rea were retained with new contracts. Luton made four pre-season signings, including defenders James Bree from Aston Villa, Tom Lockyer from Charlton Athletic, Rhys Norrington-Davies on loan from Sheffield United, and midfielder Jordan Clark from Accrington Stanley.

Competitions

EFL Championship

League table

Results summary

FA Cup

EFL Cup

Transfers

In

 Brackets around club names indicate the player's contract with that club had expired before he joined Luton.

Out

 Brackets around club names indicate the player joined that club after his Luton contract expired.

Loan in

Loan out

Appearances and goals
Source:
Numbers in parentheses denote appearances as substitute.
Players with names struck through and marked  left the club during the playing season.
Players with names in italics and marked * were on loan from another club for the whole of their season with Luton.
Players listed with no appearances have been in the matchday squad but only as unused substitutes.
Key to positions: GK – Goalkeeper; DF – Defender; MF – Midfielder; FW – Forward

References

Luton Town F.C. seasons
Luton Town